Eugène, Charles, Antoine Crosti (21 October 1833 – 30 December 1908) was a 19th-century French baritone and singing teacher.

Biography

Training 
Born in Paris, Crosti was a student at the Conservatoire de Paris where he won the First prize at the singing competition in 1857.

Opéra-Comique (1857–1866) 
He was introduced to the audience for the first time at the Opéra-Comique in La Gioconda.

He sang the role of the chambellan in La Fiancée by Auber in February 1858 and Les Sabots de la Marquise by Ernest Boulanger, in March 1858. He created the role of Chapelle in Chapelle et Bachaumont, 1 act comic opera, libretto by Armand Barthet, music by Jules Cressonois, on 18 June 1858.

Conservatoire national de musique et de déclamation (1876–1903) 
After creating the highly acclaimed characters of certain operas, he was appointed singing teacher in October 1876, at the Conservatoire de musique et de déclamation (1836), where he had Léon Escalaïs and Maria Lureau among other students. He wrote didactic works and translates arias and operas, among others Italian: Pagliacci, La Bohème, La Martyre, Zazà, Chatterton...

A member of the Higher Council of Education, he ceased his tenure in 1903 and continued to give private lessons, singing and scenery lessons.

Theories of voice and singing 
For Crosti, there is not only the chest voice and head voice; there is a kind of intermediate emission that he calls palatal voice, and that is a slight modification of the breast voice. The palatal voice is produced at the glottis level following the same mechanism as the chest voice itself (vibrating strings in all their length), but it differs from the latter in that the resonance, instead of being made above all in the thorax, is supported under the palatal vault by an appropriate arrangement of the pharynx, the soft palate. The vocal breath, sent to the frontal sinuses and striking directly at the upper walls of the palate, contracts the roundness, majesty and softness to which the nasal cavities it passes, without vibrating them, however, add sound still. It is also in this register that the richest sounds of an organ occur. It is therefore necessary to take care of the production, because it is also the medium, part of the voice in which the songs to be sung are usually written.

(Eugène Crosti. Le gradus du chanteur, 1893).

Teaching materials
1878: Abrégé de l'art du chant
1878: Six exercices vocaux
1880: La voix des enfants
1893: Le gradus du chanteur
1894: Première années de chant
1896: Précis de prononciation
1896: 
1896:

Translation

Notes

References

External links 
 Portraits sur le site de la Bibliothèque nationale de France BnF

1833 births
1908 deaths
Singers from Paris
19th-century French male opera singers
French operatic baritones
Burials at Père Lachaise Cemetery
Conservatoire de Paris alumni
Academic staff of the Conservatoire de Paris
Chevaliers of the Légion d'honneur
Chevaliers of the Ordre des Palmes Académiques